Federal Highway 185 (Carretera Federal 185) is a Federal Highway of Mexico. The highway travels from Coatzacoalcos, Veracruz in the north to Salina Cruz, Oaxaca in the south. It is also known as the Carretera Transístmica because it crosses the Isthmus of Tehuantepec. It crosses the Sierra Madre de Oaxaca at Chivela Pass.

References

185